Culbertson Island is one of the many uninhabited Canadian Arctic islands in the Qikiqtaaluk Region, Nunavut. It is a Baffin Island offshore island located in Frobisher Bay, southeast of the capital city of Iqaluit.

It is north-northwest of Gay Island. Other islands in the immediate vicinity include Low Island, Mark Island, McAllister Island, Peak Island, and Precipice Island.

References 

Uninhabited islands of Qikiqtaaluk Region
Islands of Baffin Island
Islands of Frobisher Bay